Terchová is a large village and municipality (population 4,073) in the Malá Fatra mountains in the Žilina District in the Žilina Region of northern Slovakia.

Names and etymology
In the 16th century, the village was known as Kralowa alias  Tyerchowa (1598). The name Kralowa means 'royal' in Slovak and refers to royal meadows. The name Tyerchowa comes from the Hungarian noun terhe 'burden', which was borrowed into Slovak before the 12th century as tärcha > ťarcha, and later also as tercha with the Slovak possessive suffix -ova. It refers to legal obligations of the citizens.

History
The village was established in 1580, but the area was inhabited even before its establishment. Originally a Vlach settlement from the period of Vlach colonization, it slowly began to change to an agricultural settlement, as many new settlers in the 17th century came to the village. In the 19th century, several droughts and plagues depopulated the village, as many emigrated to the US, Canada and Argentina. Near the end of World War II, half of the wooden part of the village was burned down. During the first post-war years, it was reconstructed as part of two-year plan. The village is most famous for being the birthplace and town where Juraj Janosik grew up.
In 2013 Music of Terchová was inscribed on the UNESCO's Representative List of the Intangible Cultural Heritage of Humanity.

Geography
The municipality lies at an altitude of 514 metres and covers an area of 84.542 km2. It has a population of about 4,073 people. The village lies in a valley in the Malá Fatra mountains, about 25 km east of Žilina. The tourist resort of Vrátna dolina belongs to the village.

Gallery

Notable births
Birthplace of Juraj Jánošík, who is commonly referred to as a Slovak Robin Hood.
Birthplace of Adam František Kollár, Slovak writer, historian and librarian.

References

External links
Terchová website (in Slovak)
Terchová Information in English

Villages and municipalities in Žilina District